The World is a US public radio news magazine with an emphasis on international news.  The program originated partly in response to declining coverage of international news by US commercial media. It is co-produced by WGBH and the Public Radio Exchange (PRX) of the United States.

The World was the first co-production of Public Radio International. It was also the first news co-production of the BBC World Service. For the BBC, The World was conceived as a stand-alone program and also as a template for future co-productions which might expand the reach of the BBC World Service. At its launch, it was the first program dedicated to providing global news and making a global-local connection for Americans on a daily basis.

PRX currently distributes the show to more than 300 public radio stations across the United States. The program reaches more than 2.5 million listeners every week in broadcast alone. It is hosted by Marco Werman at WGBH's studios in Boston. Werman, who has been with The World since its inception, has hosted the program since 2010. The first host was Lisa Mullins.

The World was the first daily nationally syndicated public radio program to begin podcasting some of its content, notably its coverage of technology. Its technology podcast began on February 11, 2005, hosted by Clark Boyd. Today, numerous podcasts are available by topical area and entire programs are available as podcasts.

As of October 2009, the program also now airs on CBC Radio One in Canada as part of the CBC Radio Overnight lineup.

The original theme music was composed by Eric Goldberg, but it was replaced in July 2019 with new theme music composed by Ned Porter.

Portions of the program were repackaged and rebroadcast on the weekly BBC World Service program called Boston Calling, which ended on 27 June 2020. The BBC World Service's co-production of The World ended on 30 June 2020.

Awards
The World has won over a dozen awards for its programming, including:

 2008:
 National RTNDA/UNITY Award for "ongoing commitment to covering the cultural diversity of the communities they serve."
 The World won both Asian American Journalists Association awards in radio journalism: the 2008 Unlimited Subject award for the program "Inside North Korea: a Personal Memoir", and the 2008 Asian American/Pacific Islander Issues award for the program "Asian-Americans and Gambling".
 2006:
 The World's website received the RTNDA Edward R. Murrow Award for best National Radio Network/Syndication Service Website
 The World's four-part series, "The Global Race for Stem Cell Therapies," won both an Alfred I. duPont-Columbia University Award for broadcast journalism and a Scripps Howard Foundation National Journalism Award for Excellence in Electronic Media/Radio.
 The World's four-part series "The Forgotten Plague: Malaria," received a Public Communications Award from the American Society for Microbiology.
 The World's series "Hiroshima's Survivors: The Last Generation," was honored by the Dart Center for Journalism and Trauma for excellence in coverage of victims of violence.

References

External links
The World

BBC World Service programmes
Public Radio International programs
American news radio programs
CBC Radio One programs
1995 radio programme debuts